This is a list of people who have umpired in the Australian Football League (AFL), formerly the VFL.

As of 2007 there have been a total of 1,249 umpires to have umpired at VFL/AFL Level (408 field umpires, 523 boundary umpires and 318 goal umpires). The first field umpire to be appointed to a match was Henry "Ivo" Crapp, the first boundary umpire was Chris Carriss and the first goal umpire was F. J. Burton.

There have been three female umpires to have officiated at VFL/AFL level – Katrina Pressley and Chelsea Roffey, both Queensland-based goal umpires and Eleni Glouftsis (field umpire)

Current umpires

Field

Statistics correct as of the end of Round 4 2019

Note: Umpires only receive an AFLUA Heritage Number if they start a match, rather than come on as an emergency umpire. Thus, some umpires have made their AFL debut, but not received a Heritage Number.

Boundary

John Gambetta

Goal

VFL/AFL players and umpires
This list is of VFL/AFL footballers who umpired at least one match in the league, either as a boundary, field or goal umpire. There have been a total of 85 players to achieve this distinction.

External links

Umpires
 
Umpires
Australian football